Angel tears or variants may refer to:

Angel's tears, which are three different plants.

Music
Angel Tears (duo), an Israeli-UK fusion electronica duo.
"Angel Tears" (song), a song by Barrie-James O'Neill.
"Angel Tears", a song by Pelican from the album Australasia (album).

Other
AquaNox: The Angel's Tears, an installment of AquaNox, a submarine game.
Angel tears cake (Слезы Ангела), a Russian variant of the Swedish Ostkaka curd meringue pie.